The 1870 East Suffolk by-election was held on 1 June 1870 after the incumbent Conservative MP John Henniker-Major was raised to the peerage as the fifth Baron Henniker.  It was retained by the Conservative candidate Viscount Mahon.

This was the seventh time that the Liberal candidate, Sir Shafto Adair, had been defeated in East Suffolk, although there had earlier been some speculation that he would be returned unopposed.

References

1870 elections in the United Kingdom
1870 in England
East